Love and Music is the tenth collaborative studio album by Porter Wagoner and Dolly Parton. It was released on July 2, 1973, by RCA Victor. It contains their top ten country single "If Teardrops Were Pennies".  The album reached #8 on the U.S. country albums chart.  The liner notes are written by Carl Butler and Pearl, writers of the song "If Teardrops Were Pennies", originally a hit in 1951 for Carl Smith.

Critical reception
In a positive review of the album, Billboard said, "A collection of love ballads with some of the finest cuts this consistent pair have ever come up with. Aside from the single and one other cut, Dolly and/or Porter wrote every song, and they must have been in romantic moods. Good old fashioned love music, with some timeless lyrics, and it's one everyone will want. There is even a dialog recitation." They went on to say that eight of the ten tunes...have the potential to be around for a long time." They concluded with a note to record dealers, saying that the "good cover work by Les Leverett sets the mood for the album."

In another positive review, Cashbox said, "Aptly titled, this LP contains a soothing, sincere selection of tunes that touch lightly on love—hearts and flowers abound. And there's nothing wrong with that, as anyone familiar with the phenomenal success accorded Dolly and Porter for their rendering of such sentiments should know! This is the sort of album you put on the phonograph and relax to, love to, and let the troubled world fade away. Dolly penned several delightful tunes. Catch "I Get Lonesome by Myself"."

Recording
Recording sessions for the album began at RCA Studio B in Nashville, Tennessee, on February 12 and 13, 1973. These two sessions yielded 7 of the album's ten tracks. Two more of the album's tracks were recorded during an April 9 session. "In the Presence of You" was recorded during a November 29, 1972 session for 1973's We Found It.

Track listing
Track listing, writing credits and track length adapted from LP sleeve.

References

Dolly Parton albums
Porter Wagoner albums
1973 albums
Albums produced by Bob Ferguson (music)
RCA Records albums
Vocal duet albums